The International Union of Allied Novelty and Production Workers (IUANPW) is an American labor union representing over 18,000 employees. Traditionally it organized workers at toy factories but, as that industry moved overseas, it evolved into a general union in a variety of industries. The union is affiliated with the AFL–CIO.

History 
The IUANPW was established in the 1940s. The union was originally named the International Union of Dolls, Toys, Playthings, Novelties and Allied Products of the United States and Canada. The name was changed to the International Union of Allied, Novelty and Production Workers in the late 1970s as toy manufacturing was largely shipped overseas.

During the 1990s, the union struggled with infiltration by organized crime. Union officer John Serpico from the Chicago Outfit was convicted of fraud with pension funds, two members of the Colombo crime family were convicted under the RICO Act for taking bribes from an employer on behalf of the union, and union attorney Sanford Pollack was convicted of both racketeering and arson to conceal evidence.

The 23rd Quinquennial Convention of the International Union of Allied, Novelty and Production Workers was held from April 26, 2021 to April 29, 2021 in St. Pete Beach, Florida. Also in 2021, the union lead an unsuccessful organizing drive for employees of cookie maker Tate's Bake Shop where the employer was accused of threatening to deport undocumented workers.

Today the IUANPW represents a wide array of job classifications at numerous employers in industries including general manufacturing, construction, food production, transportation, and automotive fields. Members make the Weber grill.

Structure 
The IUANPW consists of the Central States Joint Board of the Midwest and the Eastern States Joint Board of the East Coast which combined have seven affiliated locals. A majority of the membership is concentrated in the Chicago and New York City metro areas but the union currently represents workers in 11 states and Ontario, Canada. It is especially active with the Chicago Federation of Labor.

Executive board 
 President: Mark Spano
 Secretary-Treasurer: Benny Castro
 First Vice-President: Joseph Giovinco
 Second Vice-President: Anthony Iori
 Third Vice-President: Nicole Jean-Charles
 Fourth Vice-President: Angel Febus
 Executive Board Member: Phil Sitkowski
 Executive Board Member: Cosmo Lubrano
 Executive Board Member: Carl Whaling

References

Trade unions in the United States
Professional associations based in Chicago
AFL–CIO
Toy industry
Manufacturing trade unions
General unions